L'Amour fou (French for "crazy love") may refer to:

Books
L'amour fou, poetry collection by André Breton 1937

Films
L'Amour fou (1969 film)
 Amour Fou (1993 film)
Amour Fou (2014 film)
Amour Fou (The Sopranos)

Music

Albums
 Amour Fou, 1984 album by Kanda Bongo Man
 L'Amour fou (album), 2012 album by Françoise Hardy

Songs
"Amour Fou" by John Zorn, composed by John Zorn
"Amour Fou" by African Fiesta National written Sam Mangwana and Tabu Ley Rochereau
"Amour Fou" by Vetiver Composed by Andy Cabic / Devendra Banhart
"Amour Fou" by Kanda Bongo Man
"Amour Fou" by The Sinderellas Composed by Christian Behrens / Juliette Schoppmann / Lars Reinartz / Leigh Sheppard / Sven Martin
"Amour Fou" by Bernard Mayo
"Amour Fou" by Hakim Bey Composed by Hakim Bey
"Amour Fou" by African Fiesta National / Tabu Ley Rochereau
"Amour Fou" by Kris Menace Composed by Kris Menace
"L'amour Fou", by Anne Anderssen, French version of song by Murray Head, Anne Andessen 1978
"L' Amour Fou" by Léo Ferré
"L' Amour Fou" by Françoise Hardy
"L' Amour Fou by Jenifer (singer), composed by Antoine Chance / Pierre Dominique Burgaud
"Fou Amour" by Ornette Coleman Composed by Ornette Coleman

See also
Mad Love (disambiguation)